TFH Publications is an American book publisher based in New Jersey. It specializes in books about pets. In 1997 the owner, Herbert R. Axelrod sold the company to Central Garden & Pet Company of California for $70 million.

Its publications include the Tropical Fish Hobbyist Magazine.

References

External links
Official website

Book publishing companies based in New Jersey